Machaca is a preparation of dried meat. Machaca may also refer to:

 Machaca (insect)
 Machaca (fish)
 Machaca (album)